General Paget may refer to:

Arthur Paget (British Army officer) (1851–1928), British Army general 
Bernard Paget (1887–1961), British Army general
Edward Paget (1775–1849), British Army general
Lord George Paget (1818–1880), British Army general
Henry Paget, 1st Marquess of Anglesey (1768–1854), British Army general
Thomas Paget (British Army officer) (died 1741) was a British Army brigadier general